The 1892 United States presidential election in Nebraska took place on November 8, 1892. All contemporary 44 states were part of the 1892 United States presidential election. Voters chose eight electors to the Electoral College, which selected the president and vice president.

Nebraska was won by the Republican nominees, incumbent President Benjamin Harrison of Indiana and his running mate Whitelaw Reid of New York. Harrison and Reid narrowly defeated the Populist nominees, James B. Weaver of Iowa and his running mate James G. Field of Virginia, with national winner and Democratic nominees Grover Cleveland and Adlai Stevenson I a distant third and carrying only Thomas County by plurality.

Alongside 1908, this is one of only two elections where Nebraska did not vote the same as neighboring Kansas, and Weaver's is the best-ever third party performance in Nebraska presidential election history.

Results

Results by county

See also
 United States presidential elections in Nebraska

Notes

References

Nebraska
1892
1892 Nebraska elections